Jean Davoisne is a French drummer and composer.

Career
Davoisne began his career as a drums teacher, bandmaster/conductor in music schools which helped him to begin two Tama drums schools in 2008 in southern France.  He started performing at the age of 16 and did his very first project named Ultimatum in 1995, the band performed grunge/punk rock at the JMF his first step on stage. He has shared stages as drummer in several bands with various artists such as Emir Kusturica, Pleymo , Koritni, Jayen Varma, Aparna Panshikar, Angie Swan, Divinity Roxx, Noisia, Amon Tobin, DJ Miss Roxx, Billy ze Kick , Dr. Feelgood , John Coghlan's Quo. He performed later with the bands IPhaze and The Khayal Groove and has toured Canada, Europe and India. Jean Davoisne is a versatile drummer, performing Rock, Metal, World Music, Drum n' Bass, Dubstep and Neurofunk.

Recordings
Davoisne has released/co-produced 4 albums and 4 EP’. The main ones are 'The Other Side’(album) with the Band Alkimya in 2007 distributed by Brennus Music in 35 countries, 'Reflections of a purple moon’(album) in 2012 and 'Friendship'(EP) in 2015 with the band The Khayal Groove. He has also been featured on more than 10 albums as drummer/composer with various French and foreign artists. In 2013, he was featured on the album ” Eternity ” by Tina Guo, he composed the Original Sound Track for the French short movie “Le fantôme de Laurely” produced by Vis-Or Production and recorded "The Awakening", an original drums piece for the compilation "Pulsa'son #3" produced by Eric Thievon. In 2016 he records 'Conn3ction' (Live album) with the band IPHAZE.

Equipment
Davoisne endorses Tama Drums, Zildjian cymbals, Gruv Gear and Pro Orca products

References

External links 
 Official Website
 School Website 
 Grenade. Musique : rencontre avec Divinity Roxx La Dépêche du Midi
 Jean Davoisne, une autre manière d'enseigner la batterie - Route 124
 Swarnabhoomi Academy of Music

Living people
French heavy metal drummers
Male drummers
French jazz drummers
French male jazz musicians
20th-century drummers
20th-century French musicians
Year of birth missing (living people)
20th-century French male musicians